Nibaran Chandra Laskar (15 January 1902 – 25 June 1987) was an Indian politician belonging to the Indian National Congress. He was elected to the Lok Sabha lower house of the Parliament of India from the Cachar, Assam in 1952 and 1957. Laskar was also a member of the Constituent Assembly of India.

Early life and background
Nibaran Chandra Laskar was born on 15 January 1902. He was a singer, musician, sportsman, social worker, and educationist. He was a gold medalist and double MA in Sanskrit and Bengali from Dhaka University. He was a founder professor of Gurucharan College, the first college of Cachar district in the state of Assam. He was the founder Principle of Cachar college. Laskar moved into full term politics in 1944. In the year 1961, he resigned from active politics following a protest against Assam Assembly's decision to make Assamese the state language of Assam considering the fact Bengali was also a prominent language of the state. 90% of the population of Barak Valley were bengali speaking. On 13 May 1961 11 protesters were killed by police firing, at a peaceful protest even at Silchar Railway Station. Several MPs and MLAs resigned  post that incident and Laskar was one of them. He engaged in social service and philanthropy in later part of his life.

He was a Member of Silchar Local Board, Silchar Municipal Board, 1946—49; President of Cachar Kalyan Samiti, 1946–48; General Secretary of Samaj Sanjivani Samiti, Cachar; Member of All India Cottage Industries Board, 1949—52; Member of F.A.O., 1950-52, Deputy Minister of Relief and Rehabilitation, Assam Government, 1951–52; Member of Rehabilitation Finance Administration, 1956–57; Member of Assam Legislative Assembly 1947—52; Member of Constituent Assembly of India, 1947—50; Member of First Lok Sabha, 1952—57; Member of Public Accounts Committee, 1955—57.

References

External links
 Official biographical sketch in Parliament of India website



1902 births
1987 deaths
India MPs 1952–1957
India MPs 1957–1962
Indian National Congress politicians
Lok Sabha members from Assam
Members of the Constituent Assembly of India
Indian National Congress politicians from Assam